Operation Kids is a public 501(c)(3) nonprofit organization founded in 1999 in Salt Lake City, Utah. Operation Kids provides customized philanthropic services at no cost to donors seeking to give money to children's organizations.

Because all of Operation Kids’ fund-raising and administrative expenses are fully met through unrestricted donations and proceeds from a managed investment fund, 100% of every donor dollar designated for OK-approved charities and programs goes to support those programs.

Guiding philosophy
While all issues affecting children are important, some affect greater numbers of children in more significant ways. Understanding issues in context is valuable to the donor looking to make the greatest impact with a charitable contribution.
Operation Kids assesses donor-recommended organizations for effectiveness, and then creates an individualized giving plan for donors. Their goal is to maximize efforts so donations will be used efficiently.

Operation Kids Lifetime Achievement Awards
In 2008, John Walsh was the 2008 recipient for Operation Kids Lifetime Achievement award. Fighting bureaucratic and legislative resistance, John and his wife, Revé's efforts eventually led to the creation of the Missing Children Act of 1982 and the Missing Children's Assistance Act of 1984. Subsequently, they founded the Adam Walsh Child Resource Center in honor of their son. They later merged with the National Center for Missing and Exploited Children, where John serves on the board of directors.

In 2006, Ann Romney was the 2006 Operation Kids Lifetime Achievement award recipient for her many years of community service on behalf of children. She has raised awareness of children's issues, created funding programs and initiatives, and served on multiple boards and committees.

Steve Young also was a 2006 recipient for Operation Kids Lifetime Achievement award. Young was recognized for both his exceptional playing career and his dedicated service to children. His Forever Young Foundation serves children who face significant physical, emotional, and financial challenges by providing academic, athletic, and therapeutic opportunities.

In 2005, Dr. Bill and Kathy Magee were both 2005 recipients for Operation Kids Lifetime Achievement awards for founding Operation Smile. Dr. Bill and Kathy Magee started Operation Smile to repair cleft lip and palate repair surgeries to children all across the globe.

In 2004, Senator Orrin Hatch accepted the first Operation Kids Lifetime Achievement Awards for his efforts to help kids at a legislative level, including founding efforts and funding support for The National Crime Prevention Council, Best Buddies International, and numerous funding initiatives assisting children with critical needs from health insurance to education.

References

External links
 Operation Kids

Charities based in Utah
Children's charities based in the United States
Organizations established in 1999
1999 establishments in Utah